Two warships of the Royal Navy have been called HMS Engadine.

 was a seaplane tender which served in the First World War and was present at the Battle of Jutland. She was originally a merchant ship named after the Engadine valley in Switzerland, and the name was retained.
 was an aircraft transport ship launched in May 1941.
 was a Royal Fleet Auxiliary helicopter support ship that took part in the Falklands War.

Battle honours
 Jutland, 1916
 Atlantic 1943
Falkland Islands, 1982

Royal Navy ship names